Balzar Canton is a canton of Ecuador, located in the Guayas Province.  Its capital is the town of Balzar.  Its population at the 2001 census was 48,470.

Demographics
Ethnic groups as of the Ecuadorian census of 2010:
Mestizo  55.8%
Montubio  30.6%
Afro-Ecuadorian  7.8%
White  5.5%
Indigenous  0.2%
Other  0.2%

References

Cantons of Guayas Province